A steamboat a boat that is propelled primarily by steam power.

Steamboat may also refer to:

Places in the United States
Steamboat, Arizona
Steamboat, Douglas County, Oregon
Steamboat, Jackson County, Oregon
Steamboat Springs, Colorado, often shortened to Steamboat
Steamboat Ski Resort
Steamboat Springs (Nevada), the residential portions of which are known simply as Steamboat

People
Steamboat Johnson (1880–1951), an American baseball umpire
Steamboat Struss (1909–1985), an American baseball pitcher
Steamboat Williams (1892–1979), an American baseball player
Steamboat Willie (musician) (born 1951), jazz/ragtime musician and band leader
Ricky Steamboat (born 1953), an American wrestler
Vic Steamboat (born 1960), his brother, an American wrestler
Richie Steamboat (born 1987), his son, an American wrestler
Sammy Steamboat (1934–2006), an American wrestler

Other uses
Steamboat (comics), a fictional character
"Steamboat", a 1973 song by the Beach Boys from their album Holland
Steamboat (food), a Chinese hot pot

See also

Steamboat Creek (disambiguation)
Steamboat Mountain, the name of several mountains
Steamboat River (disambiguation)
Steamboat Springs (disambiguation)
Steamboat Geyser, in Yellowstone National Park
Steamboat Willie, a 1928 Disney cartoon
 Steamship, an ocean-going steam-powered vessel